Committed to the Crime is the second album released by Chaos Chaos (formerly Smoosh). It was released in 2014.

Background
After adopting the name Chaos Chaos in 2012, the band soon developed a synth-pop sound.

Reception
Vices music website, Noisey called the track "Breaker" off the album, "powerful" song, as well as "another example of their precocious talent and the sisters ability to craft hooks that are both instaneous and timeless." Spin called the track a "highlight" from the album.

In popular culture
"Do You Feel It?" was notably featured in "Auto Erotic Assimilation," the third episode of the second season of Rick and Morty.

Track listing

References

External links 

The official link for this album on Bandcamp

2014 albums
Chaos Chaos albums